Loxley may refer to:

Places
 Loxley, Alabama, a town in the United States
 Loxley, Michigan, an unincorporated community
 Loxley, South Yorkshire, a village and a suburb of the city of Sheffield, England, traditionally the birthplace of Robin Hood
 River Loxley, a river in South Yorkshire
 Loxley, Warwickshire, a village in England

Buildings
 Loxley Hall, an early-19th-century country house near Uttoxeter, Staffordshire, England
 Loxley House, a Georgian building in Sheffield, South Yorkshire, England
 Loxley House, Nottingham, the administrative home of Nottingham City Council

Organisations
 Loxley PLC, a public company and one of largest trading conglomerates in Thailand

People
 Alicia Loxley (born 1981), Australian journalist and news presenter
 Bert Loxley (1934–2008), English footballer and manager
 John Loxley (1942–2020), Canadian economist

See also
 Lacksley Castell (1962–1984) (sometimes misspelled as Loxley Castell), Jamaican reggae singer 
 Lower Loxley, a location in the fictional universe of The Archers, a long-running United Kingdom radio drama serial
 Robin of Loxley (disambiguation)